The Diocese of Madison is a Roman Catholic diocese in the U.S. State of Wisconsin. It comprises Columbia, Dane, Grant, Green, Green Lake, Iowa, Jefferson, Lafayette, Marquette, Rock, and Sauk counties. There are approximately 167,000 Catholics in the Diocese. The Bishop of the Diocese of Madison is Donald J. Hying.

There are 102 parishes in the diocese, with 98 priests in active ministry. 

The cathedral was Saint Raphael's Cathedral in Madison, but was destroyed by fire in 2005. The diocese currently has no cathedral. Parishioners of the Cathedral currently congregate at St. Patrick's and Holy Redeemer Parishes in Downtown Madison.

Camp Gray, a summer camp and retreat center, is one of the ministries of the Diocese of Madison.

History

Early years
The Diocese of Madison was established on January 9, 1946, by Pope Pius XII, in a decree dated December 22, 1945. The diocese was created out of territory from the Archdiocese of Milwaukee, Diocese of La Crosse and the Diocese of Green Bay.

Venerable Father Samuel Charles Mazzuchelli was actively involved in the southwestern part of Wisconsin during the mid 19th century. He established 25 parishes in Wisconsin, 11 of which are in the Madison Diocese. Fr. Mazzuchelli is buried in Benton, Wisconsin, which is in the diocese. Pope John Paul II declared him venerable in 1993.  The case for Fr. Mazzuchelli's elevation to the Sainthood is still pending.

Cathedral fire

On March 14, 2005. St. Raphael's Cathedral was heavily damaged in a fire that caused extensive damage to the church. In the days following the fire, it was found out that William J. "Billy" Connell had started fire. Connell was charged with burglary, arson, and bail jumping, but was deemed incompetent to stand trial due to paranoid schizophrenia. He was committed to an institution on August 29, 2005, pending a change in his mental health status, and in June 2007, was sentenced to 15 years in prison followed by 15 years of close supervision.

Following the fire, the options regarding the future of the Cathedral included:
 Rebuild the Cathedral at the current site. Those in favor of that plan cited the historical significance of the parish as a reason for rebuilding the structure.
 Build a new Cathedral at another location in Madison, such as on the city's west side. People in favor of that cited the fact that St. Raphael's was not intended to be a Cathedral when built. Previous Bishops had considering building a new Cathedral elsewhere in Madison, as there was no room downtown to build a larger Cathedral church.

In June 2007, a decision was reached to erect a new building on the site of the old Cathedral, replacing the structure that was damaged in the fire. The new building will have a different floor plan than the previous building and be capable of seating approximately 1,000 people. It will reuse the steeple and other items that can be salvaged from the original building. 

As of 2021, no new building has been erected on the former site.

Reports of sex abuse
In June 2019, the Diocese of Madison agreed to present a list of credibly accused clergy who served in the Diocese and hired detectives to assist in this investigation. This agreement came after a retired priest was charged in May 2018 with six counts of sexual assault. The retired priest, Fr. William Nolan, was later acquitted in September 2019 of five of these counts, with the presiding judge also dropping the remaining count. The Diocese of Madison also investigated Nolan and later cleared him from the title of "credibly accused" priest in March 2020 as well.

Recent

During Robert C. Morlino's term, the number of seminarians in the diocese grew from six men in 2003, to 30 by 2015. A diocesan-wide capital campaign was initiated to raise $30 million to help educate the future priests.

Bishops

Bishops of Madison
 William Patrick O'Connor (1946–1967), his resignation.
 Cletus F. O'Donnell (1967–1992), his resignation.
 William H. Bullock (1993–2003), his resignation.
 Robert C. Morlino (2003–2018), his death.
 Donald J. Hying (2019–present).

Auxiliary Bishops
 Jerome J. Hastrich (1963–1969), appointed Bishop of Gallup (1969-1990).
 George Otto Wirz (1977–2004), his resignation.

Priests who became Bishops
 Paul J. Swain, appointed Bishop of Sioux Falls (2006-2019).

Parishes

Cemeteries

Resurrection Cemetery
Resurrection Cemetery is a Roman Catholic cemetery located on the near west side in Madison, Wisconsin, the seat of the Roman Catholic Diocese of Madison.  The cemetery is one of four cemeteries officially managed by the diocese.  It was founded in 1949 and is about 40 acres in size. Famous people whose resting place in Resurrection Cemetery include Madison native Chris Farley, comedic film star and Saturday Night Live cast member, whose crypt is located in the chapel on the cemetery grounds. The first four bishops of the diocese are buried in the cemetery.

Schools

High schools
 Edgewood High School of the Sacred Heart, Madison Home
 St. Ambrose Academy, Madison St. Ambrose Academy

Grade schools
 St. Joseph's Catholic School in Baraboo is a parochial school. The current school building, designed by the Wisconsin Rapids company Billmeyer and Sons and with a cost of over $500,000, has 11 classrooms. The basement has a cafeteria and a combination auditorium/gymnasium. The second building for the school opened on a filled-in ravine in 1912, northeast of its associated church. The building had three floors and a basement. The first and second floors each had three classrooms, and the second floor also housed the chapel and the library. The third floor had a 600-seat auditorium while the basement had a large banquet hall/gymnasium.  The second building became overcrowded due to the post-World War II baby boom, so the third school building, north of the second building, opened in 1958.

See also

 List of the Catholic dioceses of the United States
 List of Roman Catholic dioceses (alphabetical) (including archdioceses)
 List of Roman Catholic dioceses (structured view) (including archdioceses)

References

External links
 Roman Catholic Diocese of Madison official website 
 The Camp Gray Web Site - A ministry of the Diocese of Madison
 Catholic Charities, Diocese of Madison

Arms

 
Madison
Culture of Madison, Wisconsin
Christian organizations established in 1946
Madison